Ikat Range is a mountain range in Buryatia, Russia. It runs in a parallel direction to the Baikal Rift. The range is named after two small rivers sharing the name "Ikat" which have their sources in opposite slopes of the range one is a tributary of the Gargi (Barguzin basin) and the other a tributary of the Vitimkan (Vitim basin).

The name of the range originated in an Evenki word. A section of the northwestern slopes of the range is part of the Dzherginsky Nature Reserve, a protected area.

Geography  
The Ikat range is located in Central Buryatia, east of the Baikal Lake.

The range is a watershed between the Barguzin River and the Vitim river. The Barguzin river separates the Ikat Range from the Barguzin Range in the west, while the Turka valley separates it from the Ulan-Burgas and the Selenga Highlands to the south. Beyond the northern end lies the valley of the Upper Angara River and the Southern Muya Range of the Stanovoy Highlands rises to the northeast. To the southwest the valley of the upper Ina River separates the Ikat range from the Golondin Range. 

Lakes Baunt and Kapylyushi lie off the eastern slopes of the northern section of the range. The Barguzin and several of its left tributaries, have their sources in the western slopes of range. On the eastern side rise the Tsipa, Tsipikan and the upper course tributaries of the Vitim river, which receives the name "Vitim" below the confluence of rivers Vitimkan and China.

Flora
The highest parts of the range are topped by thickets of dwarf cedar and mountain tundra vegetation.

See also
List of mountains and hills of Russia
South Siberian Mountains

References

External links
Skiing across the Ikat and other ranges (in Russian)

Mountain ranges of Russia
Landforms of Siberia
Landforms of Buryatia
South Siberian Mountains

ru:Икатский хребет